Trichloroethylsilane is a compound with formula Si(C2H5)Cl3.

Chlorosilanes